Plectrocerum is a genus of beetles in the family Cerambycidae, containing the following species:

 Plectrocerum cribratum Sallé, 1856
 Plectrocerum spinicorne (Olivier, 1795)

References

Heteropsini